The following is a list of films that were filmed wholly or partially in Oxford, England (often featuring the University of Oxford):

 Accident (1967)
 The Italian Job (1969)
 Heaven's Gate - Harvard commencement sequences shot in New College Lane, the Sheldonian Theatre and at Mansfield College in 1980.
 Another Country (1984)
 Oxford Blues (1984)
 Young Sherlock Holmes (1984)
 A Fish Called Wanda (1988)
 Howards End (1992)
 Shadowlands (1993)
 The Madness of King George (1994)
 True Blue (1996)
 The Saint (1997)
 Wilde  (1997)
 The Red Violin (1998)
 Saving Private Ryan (1998)
 Mohabbatein (2000) (Bollywood film)
 102 Dalmatians (2000)
 Quills (2000)
 Iris (2001)
 Harry Potter and the Philosopher’s Stone (2001)
 Harry Potter and the Chamber of Secrets (2002)
 Harry Potter and the Goblet of Fire (2005)
 Bhagam Bhag (2006) (Bollywood film)
 Blue Blood (2006)
 The History Boys (2006)
 The Golden Compass (2007)
 Salaam-e-Ishq (2007) (Bollywood film)
 Brideshead Revisited (2008)
 I Can't Think Straight (2008)
 The Oxford Murders (2008)
 An Education (2009)
 Alice in Wonderland (2010)
 Robinson in Ruins (2010)
 X-Men: First Class (2011)
 Desi Boyz (2011)
 Belle (2013)
 The Riot Club (2014)
 Doctor Strange (2016)
 Transformers: The Last Knight (2017)
 The Mummy (2017)
 Mamma Mia! Here We Go Again (2018)
 Tolkien (2019)

References

Oxford-related lists